Kyuden Voltex is a Japanese rugby team owned by  Kyushu Electric Power Co. (Kyūshū Denryoku). The nickname "Voltex" is a conflation of "Voltage" and "Techniques" and was decided after the team won promotion to the Top League. The team is based in Kashii, Fukuoka and from the 2007-8 season is playing in the semi-professional Top League at the top of Japanese domestic rugby. It is the third team based in Kyūshū to play in the league, the other two being Coca-Cola Red Sparks and Munakata Sanix Blues.

In the fifth season of the Top League (2007-8) Kyuden managed to avoid the play-offs and stay in the league. They also won the league's "Fair Play" prize.

Team colours

Main: red with yellow trimmed jersey, black shorts; Second: white jersey and shorts with blue trim. See here. The former are Kyuden's traditional colours since founding of the club. The colours to be used in the Top League were announced on October 12, 2007.

Squad

The Kyuden Voltex squad for the 2023 season is:

Coach
Zane Hilton

References

External links
 Official Home Page
 Kyuden v Sanix (QuickTime movie, Top League game, January 20, 2008)

Rugby in Kyushu
Rugby clubs established in 1951
Sports teams in Fukuoka, Fukuoka
1951 establishments in Japan
Japan Rugby League One teams